Renuka Singh may refer to:
 Renuka Singh (cricketer)
 Renuka Singh (politician)